The O'Connor Cup may refer to:

 HEC O'Connor Cup/Michael O'Connor Cup, a Ladies' Gaelic football intervarsity competition.
 O'Connor Cup, awarded to the winners of the Munster Senior Club Football Championship.
 Michael O'Connor Cup, awarded to the winners of the Kerry Club Football Championship. 
 O'Connor Cup, a trophy awarded at the Head of the River regatta.
 Liam O'Connor Cup, an inter county under-20 Gaelic football competition.
 Tom O'Connor Cup, featuring Ladies' Gaelic football teams affiliated with London GAA
 James O'Connor Cup, featuring teams affiliated with Leinster Rugby.